Willem M. de Vos (born 30 October 1954, in Apeldoorn) is a Dutch academic and microbiologist. He studied for his PhD at the University of Groningen. He is notable for winning the Spinozapremie in 2008. De Vos is currently serving as an Academy Professor for the Academy of Finland.

Since 2009 De Vos is member of the Royal Netherlands Academy of Arts and Sciences.

References

External links
http://www.wewur.wur.nl/popups/vcard.aspx?id=VOS017&lang=uk
NWO/Spinoza Prize jury report for Prof. W.M. (Willem) de Vos

1954 births
Living people
Academic staff of the University of Helsinki
Dutch microbiologists
Members of the Royal Netherlands Academy of Arts and Sciences
People from Apeldoorn
Spinoza Prize winners
University of Groningen alumni
Academic staff of Wageningen University and Research